Rémy Huberdeau is a Canadian filmmaker from Winnipeg, Manitoba. He is transgender, and many of the films he has worked on or directed touch upon the topic of being transgender. He is currently based in Toronto, Ontario, Canada. He has worked on films in both French and English.

Biography 
Rémy Huberdeau (born circa 1981) was born and raised in the primarily French-speaking neighbourhood of Saint Boniface in Winnipeg, Manitoba, Canada, as Mireille Huberdeau, a name under which some of his early films were released. For his post-secondary education, he studied at the nearby University of Manitoba, where he acquired a degree in Native Studies. He is Franco-Manitoban. After university, Huberdeau moved to Montreal, Quebec, to pursue his passion of film-making. In 2009, he graduated from the Institut National de l’Image et du Son (INIS).

Career 
Huberdeau focuses his film-making on the documentary genre. His directorial debut, Love letter to Saint-Boniface (2002), is an experimental short documentary film about his hometown, and the homophobia he has experienced there. He directed this film when he was just 21 years old with the help of Video Pool, a non-profit film co-operative based in Winnipeg. Years later, Huberdeau released another experimental short documentary film, Home of the Buffalo (Au pays des esprits), in 2009, the same year he graduated from INIS. The school was involved in the making of this film, as it originated from a school-related exercise. This film has been categorised as a visual letter from Huberdeau to his father, while also combining archival photographs of working-class people from the 1920s.

In 2010, Huberdeau worked as an editor on a documentary about the residential school system in Canada, titled Courage to Remember: Stories of our Labrador Residential School Experience.

In 2013, Huberdeau released his most well-known film, a forty-six minute documentary titled Transgender Parents. As its title suggests, this film revolves around a few transgender people and how they raise their children, how they may differ from society's expectations, and their children's reactions to their transitions. He became involved with making this film after meeting Rachel Epstein, a co-founder of the Dykes Planning Tikes program in Toronto.

Filmography

References 

1981 births
Living people
Canadian documentary film directors
Film directors from Winnipeg
Franco-Manitoban people
LGBT film directors
Canadian transgender people
People from Saint Boniface, Winnipeg
Transgender men
University of Manitoba alumni